"That's How I Got to Memphis", sometimes titled "How I Got to Memphis", is a country music standard written by American country music artist Tom T. Hall. The song tells a man's story of coming to Memphis to look for a former lover. The song first appeared on Hall's 1969 album Ballad of Forty Dollars & His Other Great Songs. It has been widely covered, most notably by Bobby Bare in 1970, Deryl Dodd in 1996, and Charley Crockett in 2018.

Bobby Bare version

Bobby Bare covered the song under the name "How I Got to Memphis" on his 1970 album This Is Bare Country.

Critical reception
An uncredited review in Billboard called the song "potent Tom T. Hall material, delivered in one of Bare's finest performances."

Chart performance
Bobby Bare's version spent 16 weeks on the Hot Country Songs charts, peaking at number 3.

Deryl Dodd version

In late 1996, Deryl Dodd covered the song for his debut album One Ride in Vegas. The song was the album's second single. In place of a b-side, the single release contained album snippets.

Critical reception
Don Yates of Country Standard Time called Dodd's version of the song "impassioned".

Chart performance
Dodd's version charted on Hot Country Songs for 20 weeks, peaking at number 36 in early 1997.

Other versions
The song has been widely covered by other artists and is now considered a standard.

A French language version entitled "Sur la route de Memphis" was a hit for French rock and country artist Eddy Mitchell and was the title track for his 1977 album.

The song is also featured in the series finale of The Newsroom (American TV series).

References

1970 singles
1996 singles
1969 songs
Bobby Bare songs
Tom T. Hall songs
Rosanne Cash songs
Deryl Dodd songs
Mercury Records singles
Columbia Records singles
Song recordings produced by Jerry Kennedy
Song recordings produced by Blake Chancey
Songs written by Tom T. Hall
Songs about Memphis, Tennessee